Count James Bruce (Russian: Я́ков Алекса́ндрович Брюс tr. Yakov Alexandrovich Bryus; 1732 – 30 November 1791) was a Russian general whose grandfather had immigrated to Russia from Britain. His grandfather was Lieutenant General Robert Bruce and great-nephew of Jacob Bruce. His father was Lieutenant Colonel Count Alexander Bruce, Ekaterina Alekseyevna Dolgorukova was his stepmother. James Bruce married Praskovia Rumiantseva, sister of General (and later Field Marshal) Pyotr Rumyantsev. Praskovia was a lady-in-waiting and friend of Catherine the Great. These connections greatly helped the career of James Bruce. In 1774, he became Commander of the Finland Division.

Even after Praskovia was banned from the court in 1779, after having had an affair with the Empress' lover, Bruce stayed in favour and received new posts. Bruce first became simultaneously Governor-General of Moscow and Saint Petersburg Governorate between 1784 and 1786, and then of Saint Petersburg only until 1791. He died the same year, without male offspring, and with him ended the line of the Russian counts Bruce. His only daughter Catherine died childless in 1829.

See also
Scottish Russians

Notes

External links
 Yakov Alexandrovich Bruce, Moscow's commander-in-chief (Московский главнокомандующий) from 4 September 1784 to 26 June 1786

1732 births
1791 deaths
Counts of the Russian Empire
Imperial Russian Army generals
18th-century military personnel from the Russian Empire
Russian people of Scottish descent
Burials at the Annunciation Church of the Alexander Nevsky Lavra